BBQ Chickens (often stylized as BBQ CHICKENS) is a Japanese hardcore punk band, created in 2000 by former Hi-Standard member Ken Yokoyama. All four members have been "buddies since childhood", and convened to form the band when Ken announced the hiatus of Hi-Standard. Since their beginning, they have released five studio albums, and have enjoyed unexpected success in different forms. Their first album, Indie Rock Strikes Back, sold upwards of 85,000 copies and rocketed them onto the Japanese punk scene, where they played several sold out shows. BBQ Chickens later won the award for "Best Alternative Video" during the 2002 Space Shower Music Video Awards for their video "Sick Guy/Stupid Magazine", and the year after with "Pizza of Death's Theme/Fat Boy". BBQ Chickens' third album, Fine Songs, Playing Sucks, was a cover album, and was noted by the idea that it was a "selection of most unusual songs to cover."

Discography

Members 

 Hongolian – vocals (2000–present)
 Ken Yokoyama – guitar, backing vocals (2000–present)
 Iso – bass (2000–present)
 Andrew – drums (2009–present)

See also 
 Hi-Standard
 Pizza of Death Records

References 

 Pizza of Death Records

Japanese punk rock groups